James Alexander Ritcher (born May 21, 1958) is an American former professional football player who was an offensive lineman in the National Football League (NFL) for 16 seasons during the 1980s and 1990s. Ritcher played college football for North Carolina State University, and received All-American honors.  He was picked in the first round of the 1980 NFL Draft, and played professionally for the Buffalo Bills and Atlanta Falcons of the NFL.

Early years
Ritcher was born in Berea, Ohio. He attended Highland High School in Medina, Ohio, where he wrestled and played high school football.

College career
He attended North Carolina State University, and played for the NC State Wolfpack football team from 1976 to 1979. As a senior in 1979, he was a consensus first-team was an All-American and won the Outland Trophy as the nation's best college interior lineman.

Professional career
In the National Football League, Ritcher was moved to guard from center by the Buffalo Bills, for whom he played 14 seasons. He started in all four Super Bowl appearances of the Bills (Super Bowl XXV, Super Bowl XXVI, Super Bowl XXVII, and Super Bowl XXVIII) and was selected to two Pro Bowls. He finished his career with the Atlanta Falcons.

Life after football
In 1998, he was selected to the College Football Hall of Fame, and in 2012 he was inducted as a member of the inaugural class of the NC State Athletic Hall of Fame   He is currently working as a commercial pilot, flying for American Airlines.

References

1958 births
Living people
American football centers
American football offensive guards
Atlanta Falcons players
Buffalo Bills players
NC State Wolfpack football players
All-American college football players
American Conference Pro Bowl players
College Football Hall of Fame inductees
People from Berea, Ohio
People from Medina, Ohio
Players of American football from Ohio
Commercial aviators